Takete-Isao is a village in Yagba East local government area of Kogi-State southwest Nigeria in west Africa.  It is bordered by Ijowa-Isanlu from the North and Imela-Ejuku from the South. The major occupation in this village is small scale agriculture, specializing in Yam Cultivation, Cassava flour, grain crops, cashew plantation, palm oil, etc.

Religion 
Takete- Isao people are predominantly Christians and few traditional Religion, they have Churches like Roman Catholic, Evangelical Church winning all (ECWA), The Apostolic Church (TAC), Pentecostal Church of God (PCGC), Church of God in Christ etc. (CGC)

Schools 
 Yagba East Local Government Education Authority Primary School (YELGEA), Takete-Isao.
 Community High School, (CHS) Takete-Isao

References

 Local Government Areas in Yorubaland